Shar-Kali-Sharri (DShar-ka-li-Sharri; reigned c. 2217–2193 BC middle chronology, c. 2153–2129 BC short chronology) was a king of the Akkadian Empire.

Rule
Succeeding his father Naram-Sin in c. 2217 BC, he came to the throne in an age of increasing challenges. The raids of the Gutian that began in his father's reign were becoming more and more frequent, and he was faced with a number of rebellions from vassal kings against the high taxes they were forced to pay to fund the defence against the Gutian threat. As a result, the new Akkadian emperor stripped Sumerian city-states of their local rule completely by destroying what remained of their governmental buildings. Moreover, he finished the establishment of direct Akkadian rule, a process initiated by his predicessor.   Contemporary year-names for Shar-kali-sharri of Akkad indicate that in one unknown year of his reign, he captured Sharlag, king of Gutium, while in another year, "the yoke was imposed on Gutium".  
According to a recent book called "In context: The reade Festschrift" (page 11 to 42), the Gutians established an independent rule, over mesopotamia, only after the death of Sharkallisharri, not before it. Additionally, The new king managed to incorporated the Gutian army into the Umma branch of his overall Akkadian army. Moreover, the latter book proposes that the land of Gutium may well be the Oxus region. Regardless of the exact location of Gutium, these new findings suggests that the new emperor rose up to the challenge contrary to conventional beliefs.

Year names of Shar-Kali-Sharri
Lists of year names can be found for many rulers from the time of the Akkadian Empire, including Shar-Kali-Sharri. They shed light on the length of his reign and the main events:

Submission of Sumerian kings

The submission of Sumerian rulers to Shar-Kali-Sharri, is recorded in the seal inscriptions of Sumerian rulers such as Lugal-ushumgal, governor (ensi) of Lagash ("Shirpula"), circa 2230-2210 BC. Several inscriptions of Lugal-ushumgal are known, particularly seal impressions, which refer to him as governor of Lagash and at the time a vassal (arad, "servant" or "slave") of Naram-Sin, as well as his successor Shar-kali-sharri. One of these seals proclaims:

Loss of Lagash

Although Lugal-ushumgal, Governor of Lagash, proclaimed himself as a vassal of Shar-Kali-Sharri, his successor Puzer-Mama took control of Lagash during Shar-kali-sharri's reign, when troubles with the Guti left the Sargonic king with only "a small rump state whose center lay at the confluence of the Diyala and Tigris river." Puzer-Mama started the 2nd Dynasty of Lagash.

Out of the 24 years of his reign, names survive for some 18 of them, and indicate successful campaigns against the Gutians, Amorites, and Elamites, as well as temple construction in Nippur and Babylon. Shar-Kali-Sharri reported defeating the Elamites at Akshak.

Fall into anarchy
Sumer also suffered from a terrible drought during Shar-Kali-Sharri's reign in about c. 2200 BC, leading to the complete abandonment of some cities. This is complementary to Egyptian records, which suggest there was a drought around the same time during the reign of king Pepi II. After Shar-Kali-Sharri's death in c. 2193 BC, Sumer fell into anarchy, with no king able to achieve dominance for long. The king list states:

"Then who was king? Who was not the king? Igigi, Imi, Nanum, Ilulu: four of them ruled for only 3 years."

Legacy
The next recorded king of Akkad to rule for any reasonable amount of time was Dudu, who is said by the king list to have reigned for 21 years. However, by this time the Akkadian empire was no more, and Dudu most likely controlled no more than Akkad itself, meaning Shar-Kali-Sharri was the last Akkadian king to actually have an empire under his control.

In the 1870s, Assyriologists thought Shar-Kali-Sharri was identical with the Sargon of Agade of Assyrian legend, but this identification was recognized as mistaken in the 1910s.

Inscriptions

See also

History of Sumer

References

23rd-century BC kings of Akkad
22nd-century BC kings of Akkad
Sumerian kings
Akkadian kings
Akkadian Empire